Manylovitsa is a rural locality (a village) in Pogorelovskoye Rural Settlement, Totemsky District, Vologda Oblast, Russia. The population was 88 as of 2002.

Geography 
Manylovitsa is located 56 km southwest of Totma (the district's administrative centre) by road. Gorbentsovo is the nearest rural locality.

References 

Rural localities in Tarnogsky District